The Five Pure Lights is an essential teaching in the Dzogchen tradition of Bon and Tibetan Buddhism. For the deluded, matter seems to appear. This is due to non-recognition of the five lights. Matter includes the mahābhūta or classical elements, namely: space, air, water, fire, earth. Knowledge (rigpa) is the absence of delusion regarding the display of the five lights. This level of realization is called rainbow body.

Basis (gzhi)
In the basis there were neutral awarenesses (sh shes pa lung ma bstan) that did not recognize themselves. (Dzogchen texts actually do not distinguish whether this neutral awareness is one or multiple.) This non-recognition was the innate ignorance. Due to traces of action and affliction from a previous universe, the basis became stirred and the Five Pure Lights shone out. When a neutral awareness recognized the lights as its own display, then that was Samantabhadra (immediate liberation without the performance of virtue). Other neutral awarenesses did not recognize the lights as their own display, and thus imputed "other" onto the lights. This imputation of "self" and "other" was the imputing ignorance. This ignorance started sentient beings and samsara (even without non-virtue having been committed). Yet everything is illusory, since the basis never displays as anything other than the five lights. 

For the deluded, matter seems to appear. This is due to non-recognition of the five lights. Matter includes the mahābhūta or classical elements, namely: space, air, water, fire, earth. The illusion of matter includes even the formless realms and the minds of sentient beings. For example, the beings of the formless realms are made of subtle matter.  And the mind of a human is merely matter, specifically vayu (wind, air). 

The Five Pure Lights are essentially the Five Wisdoms (Sanskrit: pañca-jñāna). Tenzin Wangyal holds that the Five Pure Lights become the Five Poisons if we remain deluded, or the Five Wisdoms and the Five Buddha Families if we recognize their purity.

In the Bonpo Dzogchen tradition, the Five Pure Lights are discussed in the Zhang Zhung Nyan Gyud and within this auspice two texts in particular go into detail on them as The Six Lamps and The Mirror of the Luminous Mind.

Texts
The Five Pure Lights are also evident in the terma traditions of the Bardo Thodol (Gyurme, et al. 2005) where they are the "coloured lights" of the bardo for example, associated with the different "families" (Sanskrit: gotra) of deities. There are other evocations of the rainbow lights as well in the Bardo Thodol literature such as Namkha Chokyi Gyatso (1806-1821?), the 3rd Dzogchen Ponlop's "Supplement to the Teaching revealing the Natural Expression of Virtue and Negativity in the Intermediate State of Rebirth", entitled Gong of Divine Melody, wherein the "mandala of spiralling rainbow lights" Gyurme et al. (2005: p. 339) is associated with Prahevajra. Dudjom, et al. (1991: p. 337) ground the signification of the "mandala of spiralling lights" as seminal to the visionary realization of tögal.

See also
Five Dhyani Buddhas, with colours associated with the different deities

Notes

References

Citations

Works cited

Further reading
Rinpoche, Tenzin Wangyal (2002). Wonders of the Natural Mind.  Snow Lion Publications, Ithaca, New York.
Scheidegger, Daniel (2007). "Different Sets of Light-Channels in the Instruction Series of Rdzogs chen" in Revue d'Etudes Tibétaines. Source:  (accessed: Wednesday March 7, 2012)
Garson, Nathaniel & Germano, David (2001). Extended Wylie Transliteration Scheme. University of Virginia.
Gyurme Dorje (trans.), Coleman, Graham,  with Thupten Jinpa (eds.) (2005). The Tibetan Book of the Dead [English title]: The Great Liberation by Hearing in the Intermediate States [Tibetan title]; composed by Padma Sambhava: revealed by Karma Lingpa. London: Penguin Books.  (the first complete translation)
Dudjom Rinpoche and Jikdrel Yeshe Dorje. The Nyingma School of Tibetan Buddhism: its Fundamentals and History. Two Volumes. 1991. Translated and edited by Gyurme Dorje with Matthew Kapstein. Wisdom Publications, Boston. 

Dzogchen